You Should Be Living (2002) is the third and last full-length album released by Twothirtyeight on Tooth & Nail Records. It was produced by James Paul Wisner, who also produced albums for Dashboard Confessional and Further Seems Forever.

Track listing
"Modern Day Prayer" – 3:48
"The Sticks Are Woven in the Spokes" – 3:56
"Forty Hour Increments" – 2:47
"Romancing the Ghost" – 4:30
"That Sad and Holy Glow" – 2:51
"Step Into the Light" – 3:31
"Sad Semester" – 4:13
"I Pretend to Choke" – 4:38
"Rhythm and Blues" – 3:50
"The Bathroom Is a Creepy Place for Pictures of Your Friends" – 2:48

References

Twothirtyeight albums
2002 albums
Tooth & Nail Records albums
Albums produced by James Paul Wisner